Anna Fendi (born in Rome, 23 March 1933) is an Italian fashion designer and entrepreneur; she created the Fendi brand along with her sisters Alda, Carla, Franca and Paola.
She has two daughter: Silvia, Fendi's artistic director of accessories and menswear, and Ilaria, past Fendissime artistic director and shoe designer.

Awards

References

External links
 
 Shanghai Daily: Patsy Yang: Living Roman dreams in heart of Rome  5 March 2017
 Shanghai Daily: Patsy Yang: Timeless luxury at Villa Laetitia 1 May 2016

1933 births
Living people
Fashion designers from Rome
Italian women fashion designers
Italian fashion designers